Nikolaos Tsangas (born 26 November 1940) is a Greek former water polo player. He competed in the men's tournament at the 1968 Summer Olympics. He played for Ethnikos Piraeus in the 60's.

References

External links
 

1940 births
Living people
Greek male water polo players
Olympic water polo players of Greece
Water polo players at the 1968 Summer Olympics
Water polo players from Patras
Ethnikos Piraeus Water Polo Club players